Planner may refer to:
 A personal organizer (book) for planning
 Microsoft Planner
 Planner programming language
 Planner (PIM for Emacs)
 Urban planner
 Route planner
 Meeting and convention planner
 Japanese term for video game designer

See also
 Plan (disambiguation)
 The Plan (disambiguation)
 Automated planning and scheduling